Campiglossa stigmosa is a species of fruit fly in the family Tephritidae.

Distribution
The species is found in Indonesia, Papua New Guinea.

References

Tephritinae
Insects described in 1916
Diptera of Asia
Diptera of Australasia